Fantasy was the 1988 release by the German pop group Münchener Freiheit.  This was their second album to be recorded in English, containing English versions of all tracks from their fifth studio album, Fantasie.

The album is best known for the international hit single, "Keeping the Dream Alive", which gave the band their only UK hit (peaking at #14 in the UK Singles Chart) and gave them moderate exposure in the US after being featured in the 1989 movie Say Anything....

Track listing
All music by Stefan Zauner and Aron Strobel except "So Good" (Stefan Zauner and Michael Kunzi). All lyrics by Tim Touchton and Curtis Briggs except "The Land of Fantasy", "Tears are a Girl's Best Friend" and "So Good" (Touchton) and "On the Run to be Free" (Briggs).
 "Keeping the Dream Alive" – 4:16
 "Kissed You in the Rain" – 3:48
 "Diana" – 4:17
 "The Land of Fantasy" – 4:55
 "Moonlight" – 3:11
 "Tears are a Girl's Best Friend" – 4:56
 "So Good" – 4:08
 "Forever and a Day" – 3:20
 "Poor Little Boy" – 3:28
 "On the Run to be Free" – 4:08
 "Keeping the Dream Alive" (Extended Version) – 6:33 (Not on LP, MC or US CD versions)

Personnel
 Stefan Zauner – vocals
 Aron Strobel – Guitar
 Michael Kunzi – Bass
 Alex Grünwald – keyboards
 Rennie Hatzke – drums
 Tim Touchton – Lyrics
 Curtis Briggs – Lyrics

Produced by Armand Volker

References

1988 albums
Münchener Freiheit albums
CBS Records albums